Charli Grace D'Amelio (born May 1, 2004) is an American social media personality. She was a competitive dancer for over 10 years before starting her social media career in 2019, when she started posting dance videos on the video-sharing platform TikTok. She quickly amassed a large following and subsequently became the most-followed creator on the platform in March 2020 until she was surpassed by Khaby Lame in July 2022.

D'Amelio made her feature film debut with a voice role in the 2020 animated film StarDog and TurboCat. Since 2021, she has starred in the Hulu docuseries, The D'Amelio Show and the Snap Original reality show Charli vs. Dixie. In 2022, D'Amelio participated as a celebrity contestant and she would go on to win, alongside Mark Ballas, in the thirty-first season of the dance competition series Dancing with the Stars.

Her other endeavours include two books, a podcast, a nail polish collection, a mattress, a makeup line, a clothing line, and a multi-product company. She is the first person to earn both 50 million and 100 million followers on TikTok. D'Amelio was the highest-earning TikTok female personality in 2019 and the highest-earning personality on the app in 2022, according to Forbes. She is often described as TikTok's biggest star.

Early life
Charli Grace D'Amelio was born in Norwalk, Connecticut, on May 1, 2004, the daughter of photographer and former model Heidi D'Amelio and business owner and former Republican Connecticut Senate candidate Marc D'Amelio. She has an older sister, Dixie, who is also a social media personality.

She began dancing at the age of three, and was a competitive dancer for over 10 years prior to starting her TikTok career in 2019.

She formerly attended the private King School in Stamford, Connecticut, but began attending school virtually following her TikTok success.

Career

2019–2021: Rise to fame and TikTok
D'Amelio first began posting on TikTok in May 2019 with a lip syncing video alongside her friend. Her first video to gain traction, a side-by-side video (known on the platform as a "duet") with user Move With Joy, was posted in July 2019. D'Amelio has expressed confusion regarding her rise to popularity, telling Variety, "I consider myself a normal teenager that a lot of people watch, for some reason. It doesn't make sense in my head, but I'm working on understanding it." Since then, her content has mainly consisted of videos dancing to trending songs on the platform. In October 2019, she gained further exposure for her videos performing a dance called the "Renegade" to the K Camp song "Lottery". She was subsequently credited with popularizing the dance on social media, while also being falsely credited with creating the dance, and was referred to as the "CEO of Renegade" by TikTok users. Following a New York Times profile of dancer Jalaiah Harmon revealing her as the original creator of the dance, D'Amelio received online backlash for not crediting Harmon, and began regularly crediting the creators of the dances she performed. She joined the collaborative TikTok content house The Hype House in November 2019 alongside her sister, Dixie.

In late 2019, former Sony Music executive Barbara Jones signed D'Amelio to her management company, Outshine Talent, and in January 2020, she signed with United Talent Agency along with the rest of her family. Bebe Rexha invited D'Amelio to perform alongside her during her opening performance for the Jonas Brothers in November 2019. That same month, she began posting on her self-titled YouTube vlog channel.

In February 2020, D’Amelio appeared in a Super Bowl commercial for Sabra Hummus along with other celebrities. In March 2020, she and her sister partnered with UNICEF for an anti-bullying campaign, while she also made an appearance in the Nickelodeon television special #KidsTogether: The Nickelodeon Town Hall, hosted by Kristen Bell. That same month, she partnered with Procter & Gamble to create the #DistanceDance challenge campaign on TikTok with the goal of encouraging social distancing during the COVID-19 pandemic, which garnered praise from Ohio Governor Mike DeWine. For her involvement in the campaign, she was nominated for a Streamy Award for Social Good Campaign. She also became the most-followed TikTok user, displacing American social media personality Loren Gray, and the first TikTok user to earn 50 million followers. D'Amelio appeared in the ABC television special The Disney Family Singalong during the performance of "We're All In This Together" from High School Musical in April 2020.

In May 2020, D'Amelio and her sister announced a podcast deal with Ramble Podcast Network, and both were included in the celebrity lineup for the television special Graduate Together: America Honors the High School Class of 2020, hosted by LeBron James. Also that month, she left the Hype House. D'Amelio starred as Tinker in the June 2020 United States release of the 2019 animated children's film StarDog and TurboCat, marking her first role in a feature film. That same month, she and her sister partnered with Morphe Cosmetics to launch Morphe 2, a makeup line. Charli and Dixie also launched a nail polish collection called Coastal Craze with Orosa Beauty in August 2020. Later that month, D'Amelio announced her debut book, titled Essentially Charli: The Ultimate Guide to Keeping It Real, which was released on December 1, 2020. The book was published by Abrams Books.  It covered topics of identity, cyberbullying, social media, and body image as well as D'Amelio's childhood and family life. The book became a New York Times bestseller.

Dunkin' Donuts offered a limited-time drink on their menu dedicated to D'Amelio and based on her "go-to" order called "The Charli" in September 2020. D'Amelio and her sister also designed limited-edition fleece sweatshirts for Hollister, released in September 2020. She joined Triller, a rival platform to TikTok, later that month, in the midst of a potential US ban on TikTok. She also made an appearance in Jennifer Lopez and Maluma's music video for their singles "Pa' Ti + Lonely". D'Amelio earned a 2021 Guinness World Record for having the most TikTok followers that same month. D'Amelio starred in the music video for the Bebe Rexha single, "Baby I'm Jealous", in October 2020. Later that month, she was nominated for three awards, including Creator of the Year, at the 10th Streamy Awards.

In November 2020, D'Amelio became the first person to earn 100 million followers on TikTok. She also earned a nomination for Social Star at the 46th People's Choice Awards. In December 2020, she was featured in an episode of the Facebook Messenger series Here for It With Avani Gregg, and also won the award for Breakout Creator at the 10th Streamy Awards. She starred in the music video for Lil Huddy's song "America's Sweetheart" in April 2021. In May 2021, D'Amelio and her sister co-created and became the face of Social Tourist, an apparel brand under Hollister, as part of a multi-year partnership with Abercrombie & Fitch, and partnered with Simmons Bedding Company to design and release the Charlie & Dixie x Simmons Mattress.

2022–present: Transition to mainstream media

D'Amelio starred alongside her family in the Hulu docuseries The D'Amelio Show, which premiered in September 2021. The series became the most-watched unscripted series among all first-season titles in the genre; its second season premiered in September 2022. It was renewed for a third season. Later that year, she starred with her sister in the Snap Original web reality competition show Charli vs. Dixie, which premiered on November 13, 2021. The series follows the sisters compete against each other in various challenges and tasks, in order to win a cash prize of US$50,000 that goes to a charity of the winner's choice. D'Amelio participated for UNICEF. Charli vs. Dixie was renewed for a second season, which premiered in November 2022.

In April 2022, it was announced D'Amelio had signed to star as the lead in Village Roadshow Pictures and Ryan Kavanaugh's upcoming supernatural thriller film Home School, eyed as the first installment of a potential eight-film franchise. It will be directed by F. Javier Gutiérrez with D'Amelio's parents and her sister, Dixie, serving as executive producers. In late August, D'Amelio and her mother, Heidi D'Amelio were announced as celebrity participants for the thirty-first season of the dance competition series Dancing With The Stars, competing separately. D'Amelio and her mother made history as the first family members to compete against each other on the show. On September 8, it was announced she was partnered with Mark Ballas. In November 2022, during the show's season finale, D'Amelio and Ballas were announced as the winners. In September 2022, she and her family announced a new project, D'Amelio Brands, which would launch and operate its own brands, focused on fashion, beauty, and lifestyle. The venture also announced a $6 million seed round which includes Fanatics CEO Michael Rubin, entrepreneur Richard Rosenblatt, Apple Senior Vice President of Services Eddy Cue, and Lionsgate CEO Jon Feltheimer as investors. The following month, she released her debut single, "If You Ask Me To" with an accompanying music video. The song first premiered during the second-season finale of The D'Amelio Show. D'Amelio performed on select dates of the Dancing with the Stars Live 2023 concert tour, which spanned from January to March 2023. She co-hosted the 36th Nickelodeon Kids' Choice Awards with American football commentator Nate Burleson on March 4, 2023.

Public image and reception
D'Amelio has frequently been referred to in the media as TikTok's biggest star. Taylor Lorenz of The New York Times called D'Amelio the "reigning queen" of TikTok. Trey Taylor of The Face called her and her sister Dixie the "CEOs of TikTok". In an article for The Washington Post, Travis M. Andrews called her "[TikTok's] undisputed ruler". Cassidy George of The New Yorker called her the "face of TikTok". Much of her appeal has been attributed to her content being seen as relatable and authentic. Marc Faddoul, an artificial intelligence researcher at the University of California, Berkeley, credited her status as a "median user" and a "safe recommendation choice that can generate engagement across the board" as reasons for her fame.

Mel Magazines Joseph Longo called her "one of the first polarizing figures on the video app — the embodiment of the strange, precarious and unpredictable new world of Gen Z online fame", noting that social media users criticized her as being "basic", "cringeworthy", and "overhyped". In regard to D'Amelio's early popularity, Rachel Monroe of The Atlantic wrote, "As Charli's follower count grew, her popularity acquired a reflexive quality; essentially, she became a meme for other TikTokers to react to. There was a flurry of 'I don't get why Charli is so popular' posts, followed by backlash-to-the-backlash videos tagged #teamcharli and #unproblematicqueen." Writing for Vanity Fair, Carino Chocano called her the "face" of "Straight TikTok", a colloquialism used to describe the mainstream part of TikTok, with "straight" referencing the fact that many of the users who make up "Straight TikTok" are heterosexual.

She appeared on both the Forbes 30 Under 30 list and on Fortune 40 Under 40 list in 2020, making her the youngest person to appear on Fortunes list. Fashion search engine Lyst placed D'Amelio at eighth on their annual Power Dressers list, which identifies the most influential public figures in fashion based on the company's search, sales, and social media metrics, in 2020. The company also listed D'Amelio second on their collaborative Next 20 list with Highsnobiety, which determines the most prominent "breakout cultural pioneers" in fashion using search metrics and sales. In 2021, she was included on the Time100 Next list, an extension to the Time 100 list, and in Teen Vogues Young Hollywood Class of 2021.

Other TikTok users, including Lisa Beverly and Ellie Zeiler, became notable on the platform for their resemblance to D'Amelio.

Online controversies
D'Amelio and her sister received backlash after the premiere episode of the D'Amelio family's Dinner with the D'Amelios series, in which the family and American internet personality James Charles eat a paella dinner prepared by personal chef Aaron May, was posted to their family YouTube channel in November 2020. Users on social media accused both Charli and Dixie of exhibiting "rude" behavior towards May, with Charli making faces as she described the meal and subsequently asking for "dino nuggets". She also expressed during the video that she wished she had received 100 million followers on the one-year anniversary of her earning one million, for which users further criticized her. Following the backlash, D'Amelio lost over one million followers on TikTok in less than one day. Days after the video was posted, she addressed the situation in an Instagram Live video, where she apologized and told viewers, "You can hate on me for whatever I've done, but the fact that all of this is happening because of a misunderstanding...I just feel like that's not okay," in response to violent threats she was receiving. May defended the sisters in an interview, stating, "Those girls are the greatest, I love them. It was all fun and games." Charles similarly tweeted out in their defense, further comparing the controversy to the conflict which broke out between him and Tati Westbrook a year prior. Rebecca Jennings of Vox called the controversy "cruel and unnecessary", while Alice Ophelia and Faye Maidment of Dazed attributed it to misogyny.

D'Amelio faced backlash in December 2020 after it was revealed that she and a number of other social media personalities, including Hudson, had been vacationing at Atlantis Paradise Island in the Bahamas during the COVID-19 pandemic while cases in her and her family's residence of Los Angeles surged, shortly after having publicly suggested that not staying home during the pandemic was "inconsiderate". Also during this time, D'Amelio was accused of buying her TikTok followers due to some of her followers' following lists not having her listed.

Activism and charity work
Following D'Amelio's meet-and-greet in November 2019, she and her family donated the money earned from ticket sales to a special needs fundraiser.

In April 2020, D'Amelio donated $50,000 to Norwalk Hospital in her hometown of Norwalk, Connecticut, to help secure critical supplies for the hospital's staff amid the COVID-19 pandemic.

D'Amelio has openly expressed support for the Black Lives Matter movement; during the George Floyd protests in 2020, she posted a video on TikTok decrying Floyd's murder.

In December 2020, D'Amelio partnered with TikTok to donate $100,000 to the American Dance Movement, an organization which helps provide access to dance education in the United States, as part of Giving Tuesday.

Personal life
D'Amelio has stated that she suffers from an eating disorder. She has also been vocal about her experiences with body shaming. In an anti-bullying campaign for UNICEF, she said, "Some of the most hurtful comments that I read about myself online are about my body shape, my body type, which hits close to home because I struggled a lot with body image, body dysmorphia, [and] bad eating habits."

Filmography

Film

Television (as herself)

Music videos

Discography

Awards and nominations

References

External links

 
 

2004 births
21st-century American dancers
21st-century American women
American female dancers
American people of Italian descent
American TikTokers
American YouTubers
Living people
People from Norwalk, Connecticut
Social media influencers
YouTube vloggers
Dancing with the Stars (American TV series) winners